Some historical comarcas located in the Community of Madrid are:
 Comarca de Alcalá or Tierra de Alcalá
 Madrid
 Corredor del Henares
 Sierra Norte
 Sierra Este
 Sierra Noroeste
 Sierra Oeste
 Madrid Sur
 Las Vegas del Tajo
 Vega del Jarama

 
Madrid-related lists

es:Comarcas de la Comunidad de Madrid